Emertongone is a monotypic genus of dwarf spiders containing the single species, Emertongone montifer. The genus was created by Lin, Lopardo & Uhl in 2022 for the species formerly known as Oedothorax montifer and first described in 1882 as Lophocarenum montiferum. It has only been found in USA.

References

Linyphiidae
Articles created by Qbugbot